The 1926–27 Scottish Second Division was won by Bo'ness who, along with second placed Raith Rovers, were promoted to the First Division. Nithsdale Wanderers finished bottom.

Table

References

 Scottish Football Archive

Scottish Division Two seasons
2
Scot